The 2008–2009 Western Michigan Broncos men's basketball team was a National Collegiate Athletic Association Division I college basketball team representing Western Michigan University.  The team was the defending Mid-American Conference (MAC) West Division champion and was picked to finish first in the MAC West Division by members of the MAC News Media Association.

In February 2009, redshirt freshman Justin Hairston decided to transfer.

Roster

Awards
 David Kool
 Mid-American Conference Player of the Week (3)
 Week 1 – Led Charleston Classic in scoring and was named to the All-Tournament Team after putting up 24.3 points, 4.3 rebounds, 4.0 assists and 1.3 steals per game in three losses.
 Week 6 – 19 points, three rebounds, one assist and one steal in only 28 minutes in 68–55 win over Iona.
 Week 9 – 26 points and a career-high nine rebounds, three assists and two steals in victory over Central Michigan.
 Mid-American Conference Scholar–Athlete of the Week, January 11
 Charleston Classic All-Tournament Team
 Academic All-District IV First Team

Schedule

|-
!colspan=9 style=| Non-conference regular season

|-
!colspan=9 style=| MAC regular season

|-
!colspan=9 style=|MAC tournament

References

Western Michigan
Western Michigan Broncos men's basketball seasons